William Henry Bradbury (1884–1966) was an English footballer who played at half-back for Burslem Port Vale, Stoke, Aberdare, Oldham Athletic, Scunthorpe United, Rochdale and Burton Town.

Career
Bradbury played for May Bank and Newcastle Swifts, before joining Burslem Port Vale in May 1903. He made his debut on Boxing Day 1903, in a 3–1 defeat by Bristol City at the Athletic Ground. He played three further Second Division games in the rest of the 1903–04 season, and was used as an emergency player in the 1904–05, 1905–06, and 1906–07 campaigns. The club then went into financial meltdown and liquidation, at which point he was released. He joined Fegg Hayes and then moved on to Stoke, playing 28 Birmingham & District League / Southern League games for the "Potters" in the 1910–11 season. He later played for Aberdare, Oldham Athletic (in two spells), Scunthorpe United, Rochdale and Burton Town.

Career statistics
Source:

References

1884 births
1966 deaths
People from Sudbury, Derbyshire
Footballers from Derbyshire
English footballers
Association football midfielders
Port Vale F.C. players
Stoke City F.C. players
Aberdare Athletic F.C. players
Oldham Athletic A.F.C. players
Scunthorpe United F.C. players
Rochdale A.F.C. players
Burton Town F.C. players
English Football League players
Southern Football League players
Date of birth missing
Place of birth missing
Date of death missing
Place of death missing